Centralia is an unincorporated community in Craig County, Oklahoma, United States. It is said to have been founded by J. H. Hargrove in 1898 and named for Centralia, Missouri. The town prospered between 1907 and 1915, before entering a long decline. It is now considered a ghost town.

The post office opened April 11, 1899 with Hargrove as the first postmaster. Several businesses opened during the next couple of years. Most of them were housed in wooden buildings that had been constructed around a town square. Most of the business district was destroyed by a fire on January 11, 1907. Another fire on July 22, 1917, destroyed about one-third of the district.

By 1915, the population peaked at 750 residents. Two banks functioned in the town, until both failed circa 1929. A combination of the fires, the Great Depression and the failure of the proposed railroad from Vinita to Coffeyville resulted in the large-scale abandonment of Centralia. The 1980 census recorded 43 residents. By 2010, only seven or eight inhabitants remained in ZIP Code 74301.

References

Sources
Shirk, George H. Oklahoma Place Names. Norman: University of Oklahoma Press, 1987.

External links
 Centralia at GhostTowns.com
 "AbandonedOK: Centralia, OK"

Unincorporated communities in Craig County, Oklahoma
Ghost towns in Oklahoma
Unincorporated communities in Oklahoma